Ham Eun-ji (born July 23, 1997) is a South Korean professional weightlifter who earned a spot at the 2020 Summer Olympics in the 55 kg category.

Career

Eun-ji was introduced to weightlifting by her father at an early age, beginning weightlifting in grade 5.

Eun-ji is competing in the 2020 Summer Olympics in the 55 kg competition. Prior to the Olympics, she placed 1st in the Olympic test event.

Awards
2020 National Business Weightlifting Championships - Best Weightlifter.

References

External links
 

1997 births
Living people
South Korean female weightlifters
Weightlifters at the 2020 Summer Olympics
Olympic weightlifters of South Korea
21st-century South Korean women